Henry Nathaniel Andrews, Jr. (born June 15, 1910, Melrose, Massachusetts; d. March 3, 2002 Concord, New Hampshire) was an American paleobotanist recognized as an expert in plants of the Devonian and Carboniferous periods.  He was a fellow of the Geological Society of America and the American Association for the Advancement of Science and was elected into the U.S. National Academy of Sciences in 1975. He was a professor at the Washington University in St. Louis from 1940 to 1964 and a paleobotanist at the Missouri Botanical Garden 1947 to 1964. From 1964 until his retirement 1975, Andrews worked at the University of Connecticut, where he served as head of the school's Botany department and later as head of the Systematics and Environmental Section.

References

1910 births
2002 deaths
20th-century American botanists
American paleontologists
Fellows of the American Association for the Advancement of Science
Members of the United States National Academy of Sciences
Fellows of the Geological Society of America
People from Melrose, Massachusetts
University of Connecticut faculty
Washington University in St. Louis faculty